A chalice is a goblet or footed cup intended to hold a drink. This can also refer to;

 Holy Chalice, the vessel which Jesus used at the Last Supper to serve the wine
 Chalice (pipe), a type of smoking pipe
 Chalice (novel), a 2008 novel by Robin McKinley
 Chalice (superhero character), a transgender superhero character
 The Chalice and the Blade, a book by Riane Eisler
 Flaming chalice, the most widely used symbol of both Unitarianism and Unitarian Universalism
 Kamen Rider Chalice, a character from Kamen Rider Blade
 The Chalice, a public sculpture by Neil Dawson in Cathedral Square, Christchurch, New Zealand
 Chalice International, a Canadian international aid charity.

In music:
 Chalice (band), a Gothic-doom metal band from Adelaide, South Australia
 Chalice (reggae band), a Jamaican reggae band featuring guitarist Wayne Armond
 Chalice (singer), a stage name of singer and rapper Jarek Kasar from Estonia
 Chalice (record label), a defunct Britain vanity record label created by Coil